Đàm Thanh Xuân (born 11 January 1985) is a former wushu taolu athlete from Vietnam. Currently, she now works at the Department of International Cooperation and General Department of Physical Education and Sports.

Career

Early career 
Xuân was born on January 11, 1985, in the Russian Soviet Federative Socialist Republic to athlete parents who went studying abroad for a master's degree in Russia. When she was 9 years old, her neighbor Xuân Thi, who was also the head coach of the Vietnam Wushu Team, learned about her talent and advised her to join the Vietnam Wushu Team.

National team 
Đàm made her international debut at the 1999 World Wushu Championships where she became the world champion in gunshu. A year later, she won a silver and two bronze medals at the 2000 Asian Wushu Championships and thus won the bronze medal in women's changquan all-around. She then was a double gold medalist in daoshu and gunshu and a silver medalist in gunshu at the 2001 World Wushu Championships. The following year, she won a silver medal in daoshu at the 2003 Southeast Asian Games and a silver medal in gunshu at the 2003 World Wushu Championships. A year later, she won medals of every color at the 2004 Asian Wushu Championships as well as in the 2005 Southeast Asian Games. Her last competition was at the 2005 World Wushu Championships where she became the world champion in gunshu and a silver medalist in daoshu.

Awards 
 3rd class Labor Order.
 National Outstanding Athlete (1999, 2000).

Personal life 
Xuân got married with one of her childhood friend. Her husband is also a Wushu athlete - both of them have studied for a master's degree at Shanghai Sports University.

References

External links 
 Thanh Xuan Dam
 Vietnamese article
 Vietnamese article collection

1985 births
Living people
Vietnamese female martial artists
Vietnamese female swimmers
Vietnamese wushu practitioners
Southeast Asian Games silver medalists for Vietnam
Southeast Asian Games bronze medalists for Vietnam
Southeast Asian Games gold medalists for Vietnam
Southeast Asian Games medalists in wushu
Competitors at the 2005 Southeast Asian Games
Wushu practitioners at the 1998 Asian Games
21st-century Vietnamese women